Luis Manuel Otero Alcántara (born December 2, 1987) is a Cuban performance artist and dissident, known for his public performances that openly criticize the Cuban government and its policies. A self-taught artist, Alcántara lives in the El Cerro neighborhood of Havana. Since 2018 Alcántara has been arrested dozens of times for his performances in violation of Decree 349, a Cuban law requiring artists to obtain advance permission for public and private exhibitions and performances.

Protests and arrests
In 2017 Alcántara was arrested for "being in illicit possession of construction materials" in relation to his work as a cofounder of the #00 bienal de la Habana, an alternative event to the official Havana Biennial.

In April 2019 Alcántara was arrested by the Cuban police during his participation in a satellite event of the Havana Biennial.

On August 10, 2019 Alcántara was arrested in Havana during part of his performance Drapeau. In the work, he wore a Cuban flag draped over his shoulders, in defiance of a 2019 law dictating how the flag could be used.

On March 1, 2020 Alcántara was arrested in Havana on the charges of defiling patriotic symbols and property damage. At the time of the arrest, was on the way to join a protest at the Cuban Institute of Radio and Television against the censorship of a two men kissing on television.

In November 2020, Alcántara took part in a hunger strike as part of the San Isidro Movement. Alcántara and other protesters were twice detained by police during the protest.

On December 3, 2020, he was released from prison, but arrested again the same day when he joined another protest. He was released to house arrest the same day.

In April 2021, he initiated another hunger strike, gaining widespread attention and global media coverage.  In May, State security agents dressed as civilians broke into Alcántara's house and forcibly detained him and the poet Afrika Reina. To justify their assault, agents outside the house yelled, "¡Qué viva la revolución! ¡Qué viva Fidel!" The agents also confiscated some of Otero's most recent art work. Later that month, in solidarity with Alcantera, a group of activist Cuban artists working under the name 27N asked the director of the Museum of Fine Arts in Havana to remove their works from public exhibition. On May 21, 2021 Amnesty International named Alcantara a prisoner of conscience. A few days later a group of prominent international cultural figures, including Junot Díaz, Edwidge Danticat, Julie Mehretu, John Akomfrah, and Carrie Mae Weems, issued a public letter to the Cuban president requesting Alcántara's release. 

On May 31, 2021 the San Isidro Movement confirmed that Alcántara had been released from custody, after being detained in a hospital for over four weeks. On July 11, 2021 Luis Manuel was arrested by Cuban authorities on his way to join the majority of Cuban citizens who marched calling for freedom.  Since, he has been under custody. In September of 2021, Time named him one of the 100 most influential people in the world on their annual Time 100 list.  On May 30 and 31st of 2022, a closed trial was held in the District Court of Marianao in the city of La Habana, Cuba.  Although the international press requested access to the trial, the Cuban Government did not reply to requests.  As of the present moment, Otero Alcántara is facing up to 7 years in prison and awaits sentencing.

References

1987 births
Living people
Cuban artists
Cuban curators
Cuban dissidents
Political prisoners
Hunger strikers